Adams Township is a township in Grant County, South Dakota, United States.

References

Townships in Grant County, South Dakota
Townships in South Dakota